Private housing estate is a term used in Hong Kong for private mass housing – a housing estate developed by a private developer, as opposed to a public housing estate built by the Hong Kong Housing Authority or the Hong Kong Housing Society. It usually is characterised with a cluster of high-rise buildings, with its own market or shopping mall. Mei Foo Sun Chuen, built by Mobil, is the earliest (1965) and largest by number of blocks (99).

Early real estate development in Hong Kong followed the urban street pattern: single blocks are packed along streets and most of them are managed independently, with quality varying from block to block. Private housing estates on the other hand provide integrated management throughout whole estate, attracting more affluent residents.

Mei Foo Sun Chuen, Taikoo Shing, Whampoa Garden and City One Shatin are early notable examples. More projects followed and the idea became widely accepted as the middle class of Hong Kong emerged.

Trends
With the economies of scale of large developments, and the lifting of height restrictions since the opening of the new airport at Chek Lap Kok, there is the tendency of new private tower block developments with 10 to over 100 towers, ranging from 30-to-70-storeys high.

There has also been a trend in joint ventures between the already oligopolistic real-estate developer in Hong Kong. Developers have been increasingly partnering up to bid for development sites. At a land auction on 8 May 2007, the Government warned developers not to collude in bidding.

The wall effect
There is currently some controversy over the "wall effect" (literally "folding screen building") caused by uniform high-rise developments which adversely impact air circulation, leading to an aggravation of the heat effect while also impact public hygiene and contribute to air pollution. Private developers seeking to maximise revenues have tended to build uniform blocks on seafront sites to give all units unrestricted sea view.

Environmental group Green Sense expressed concern that their survey on 155 housing estates found 104 have a 'wall-like' design. It cited estates in Tai Kok Tsui and Tseung Kwan O as the "best examples".

Head of the Planning Department, Ava Ng, argued that the air ventilation factor has been taken into consideration with regard to the auction of all prime sites on the land application list, and said the erection of tall buildings at these sites will not create any "wall effect."

An air ventilation assessment is required only for sites with a total gross floor area of more than 100,000 square metres, according to technical guidelines in existence since 2006.

In May 2007, citing concern over developments in West Kowloon, and near Tai Wai and Yuen Long railway stations, Wong Kwok-hing of the Hong Kong Federation of Trade Unions proposed a motion calling for measures to reduce screen-like buildings which maximise good views at the expense of air flow in densely populated areas. The motion was vetoed by functional constituency representatives.

Lists of estates
The following is a partial list of widely known private housing estates in Hong Kong:

Hong Kong Island

Kowloon

Kwai Tsing District

Sai Kung District

Sha Tin District

Tsuen Wan District

Sham Tseng

Tuen Mun District

So Kwun Wat

Yuen Long District

See also

 Housing in Hong Kong
 List of most expensive houses in Hong Kong
 Condominium
 Commonhold

References

 
Apartment buildings in Hong Kong
Hong Kong, Private
Real estate in Hong Kong